Kolenetrus is a genus of dirt-colored seed bugs in the family Rhyparochromidae. There is one described species in Kolenetrus, K. plenus.

References

Rhyparochromidae
Articles created by Qbugbot